Donja Dubrava ("Lower Dubrava") is one of the districts of Zagreb, Croatia. It is located in the northeastern part of the city and in 2011 had 36,363 inhabitants.

List of neighborhoods in Donja Dubrava
 Čulinec 
 Donja Dubrava
 "Ivan Mažuranić"
 Novi Retkovec
 Resnički Gaj
 Poljanice
 Stari Retkovec
 "30. svibnja 1990."
 Trnava

References

External links
 Official web site of Dubrava

Districts of Zagreb